The Nordic countries (also known as the Nordics or Norden; lit. 'the North') are a geographical and cultural region in Northern Europe and the North Atlantic. It includes the sovereign states of Denmark, Finland, Iceland, Norway and Sweden; the autonomous territories of the Faroe Islands and Greenland; and the autonomous region of Åland.

The Nordic countries have much in common in their way of life, history, religion and social structure. They have a long history of political unions and other close relations but do not form a singular entity today. The Scandinavist movement sought to unite Denmark, Norway and Sweden into one country in the 19th century. With the dissolution of the union between Norway and Sweden (Norwegian independence), the independence of Finland in the early 20th century and the 1944 Icelandic constitutional referendum, this movement expanded into the modern organised Nordic cooperation. Since 1962, this cooperation has been based on the Helsinki Treaty that sets the framework for the Nordic Council and the Nordic Council of Ministers.

The Nordic countries cluster near the top in numerous metrics of national performance, including education, economic competitiveness, civil liberties, quality of life and human development. Each country has its own economic and social model, sometimes with large differences from its neighbours. Still, they share aspects of the Nordic model of economy and social structure to varying degrees. This includes a mixed market economy combined with strong labour unions and a universalist welfare sector financed by high taxes, enhancing individual autonomy and promoting social mobility. There is a high degree of income redistribution, commitment to private ownership and little social unrest.

North Germanic peoples, who comprise over three-quarters of the region's population, are the largest ethnic group, followed by the Baltic Finnic Peoples, who comprise the majority in Finland; other ethnic groups are the Greenlandic Inuit, the Sami people and recent immigrants and their descendants. Historically, the main religion in the region was Norse paganism. This gave way first to Roman Catholicism after the Christianisation of Scandinavia. Then, following the Protestant Reformation, the main religion became Lutheran Christianity, the state religion of several Nordic countries.

Although the area is linguistically heterogeneous, with three unrelated language groups, the common linguistic heritage is one factor that makes up the Nordic identity. Most Nordic languages belong to North Germanic languages, Finno-Ugric languages and Eskimo–Aleut languages. Danish, Norwegian and Swedish are considered mutually intelligible, and they are the working languages of the region's two political bodies. Swedish is a mandatory subject in Finnish schools and Danish in Faroese and Greenlandic schools. Danish is also taught in schools in Iceland.

Uninhabitable icecaps and glaciers comprise about half of this area, mainly Greenland. In September 2021, the region had over 27 million people. Especially in English, Scandinavia is sometimes used as a synonym for the Nordic countries. Still, that term more properly refers to the three monarchies of Denmark, Norway and Sweden. Geologically, the Scandinavian Peninsula comprises the mainland of Norway and Sweden and the northernmost part of Finland.

Etymology and concept of the Nordic countries 

The term Nordic countries found mainstream use after the advent of Foreningen Norden. The term is derived indirectly from the local term Norden, used in the Scandinavian languages, which means 'The North(ern lands)'. Unlike the Nordic countries, the term Norden is in the singular. The demonym is nordbo, literally meaning 'northern dweller'.

Similar or related regional terms include:

 Scandinavia refers typically to the cultural and linguistic group formed by Denmark, Norway and Sweden, or the Scandinavian Peninsula, which is formed by mainland Norway and Sweden as well as the northwesternmost part of Finland. Outside of the Nordic region the term Scandinavia is sometimes used as a synonym for the Nordic countries. First recorded use of the name by Pliny the Elder about a "large, fertile island in the North" (possibly referring to Scania).
 Fennoscandia refers to the area that includes the Scandinavian Peninsula, Finland, Kola Peninsula and Karelia. This term is mostly restricted to geology, when speaking of the Fennoscandian Shield.
 Cap of the North consists of the provinces and counties of Lapland in Finland; Finnmark, Nordland and Troms in Norway; and Lapland and Norrbotten in Sweden. This Arctic area is located around and north of the Arctic Circle in the three Nordic European countries Norway, Sweden and Finland and the Kola Peninsula in Russia.
 Barents Region is formed by the Cap of the North as well as the Northern Ostrobothnia and Kainuu regions of Finland, Swedish provinces of Lapland, Västerbotten and Norrbotten, Russian Oblasts of Arkhangelsk and Murmansk, Nenets Autonomous Okrug, as well as the Republics of Karelia and Komi. This area cooperates through the Barents Euro-Arctic Council and Barents Regional Council.

List

Sovereign states

Associated territories and other areas

History

Timeline

Early history and Middle Ages 

Little evidence remains in the Nordic countries of the Stone Age, the Bronze Age, or the Iron Age with the exception of a limited numbers of tools created from stone, bronze and iron, some jewelry and ornaments and stone burial cairns. However, one important collection that exists is a widespread and rich collection of stone drawings known as petroglyphs. The Goths, who originated in southern Scandinavia and would later divide into Visigoths and Ostrogoths, are known to have been one of the Germanic people that would later relate to the fall of the Western Roman Empire and the emergence of Medieval Europe. However, these acquired the Latin culture of Rome.

The Nordic countries first came into more permanent contact with the rest of Europe during the Viking Age. Southern Finland and northern parts of Sweden and Norway were areas where the Vikings mostly only traded and had raids, whilst the permanent settlements of Vikings in the Nordic region were in southern Norway and Sweden, Denmark and Faroes as well as parts of Iceland, Greenland and Estonia. Christian Europe responded to the raids and conquest of Vikings with intensive missionary work. The missionaries wanted the new territories to be ruled by Christian kings who would help to strengthen the church. After conversion to Christianity in the 11th century, three northern kingdoms emerged in the region: Denmark, Norway and Sweden. Iceland first became a commonwealth before it came under Norwegian rule in the early 13th century. There were several secular powers who aimed to bring Finland under their rule, but through the Second and Third Swedish Crusade in the latter part of 13th and through the colonisation of some coastal areas of Finland with Christian Swedes, the Swedish rule was gradually established in the region.

During the Middle Ages, increased trade meant that the Nordic countries became increasingly integrated into Europe and Nordic society became more Continental. The monarchies strengthened their positions in the 12th and 13th centuries through imposing taxes on peasants and a class of nobles also emerged. By the Late Middle Ages, the whole of the Nordic region was politically united in the loose Kalmar Union. Diverging interests and especially Sweden's dissatisfaction over the Danish dominance gave rise to a conflict that hampered the union from the 1430s onward until its final dissolution in 1523. After the dissolution Denmark and Norway, including Iceland, formed a personal union of the two kingdoms called Denmark–Norway whilst the successful period of Vasa Kings began in Sweden and Finland. The Lutheran Reformation played a major role in the establishment of the early-modern states in Denmark–Norway and Sweden.

Early modern period and industrialization 
Sweden was very successful during the Thirty Years' War, while Denmark was a failure. Sweden saw an opportunity of a change of power in the region. Denmark–Norway had a threatening territory surrounding Sweden and the Sound Dues were a continuing irritation for the Swedes. In 1643, the Swedish Privy Council determined Swedish territorial gain in an eventual war against Denmark–Norway to have good chances. Not long after this, Sweden invaded Denmark–Norway.

The war ended as foreseen with Swedish victory and with the Treaty of Brömsebro in 1645 Denmark–Norway had to cede some of their territories, including Norwegian territories Jemtland, Herjedalen and Idre and Serna, as well as the Danish Baltic Sea islands of Gotland and Ösel. The Thirty Years' War thus began the rise of Sweden as a great power, while it marked the start of decline for the Danish.

To some extent in the 16th century and certainly in the 17th, the Nordic region played a major role in European politics at the highest level. The struggle for dominion over the Baltic Sea and its trading opportunities raged between Denmark–Norway and Sweden, which began to impact upon the neighboring nations. Sweden prevailed in the long term and became a major European power as it extended its reach into coastal tracts in modern-day Russia, Estonia, Latvia, and – following the Thirty Years' War – also into Pomerania and other North German areas. Sweden also conquered vast areas from Denmark–Norway during the Northern Wars in the middle of the 17th century. Sweden also had several conflicts with Russia over Finland and other eastern areas of the country and after the Great Northern War (1700–1721) Sweden lost most of its territories outside the old Swedish border to Russia which then became the new major power in Northern Europe.

After the Napoleonic Wars (1803–1815), the political map of the Nordic countries altered again. In 1809, Finland was conquered by Russian Empire from Sweden in the Finnish War, after which Finland became the autonomous Grand Duchy of Finland. In turn, Sweden captured Norway from Denmark in 1814 in the Swedish–Norwegian War and started a Union between Sweden and Norway. Iceland, the Faroe Islands and Greenland, which had been re-colonised in the 18th century, became Danish. Population growth and industrialization brought change to the Nordic countries during the 19th century and new social classes steered political systems towards democracy. International politics and nationalism also created the preconditions for the later independence of Norway in 1905, Finland in 1917 and Iceland in 1944.

Late modern period and contemporary era 

During the two world wars and the Cold War, the five small Nordic states were forced into difficult balancing acts, but retained their independence and developed peaceful democracies. The Nordic states had been neutral during World War I, but during World War II they could no longer stand apart from world politics. The Soviet Union attacked Finland in 1939 and Finland ceded territory following the Winter War. In 1941, Finland launched a retaliatory strike in conjunction with the German attack on the Soviet Union. However, more territory was lost and for many years to come Finnish foreign policy was based on appeasing the Soviet Union, even though Finland was able to retain its democratic form of government. Denmark and Norway were occupied by Germany in 1940. The Allies responded by occupying Iceland, the Faroe Islands and Greenland. Sweden managed to formally maintain its neutrality in the Axis/Allies conflict and avoided direct hostilities, but in practice it adapted to the wishes of the dominant power – first Germany, later the Allies. However, during the Winter War between Finland and Russia in 1939–1940, Sweden did support Finland and declared itself "non combatant" rather than neutral.

Compared with large parts of Europe, the Nordic region got off lightly during the World War II, which partially explains its strong post-war economic development. The labour movement – both trade unions and political parties – was an important political presence throughout the Nordic countries in the 20th century. The big social democratic parties became dominant and after World War II the Nordic countries began to serve as a model for the welfare state. Economically, the five Nordic countries were strongly dependent on foreign trade and so they positioned themselves alongside the big trading blocks. Denmark was the first to join European Economic Community (EEC) in 1972 and after it became European Union (EU) in 1993 Finland and Sweden also joined in 1995. Norway and Iceland are members of the European Free Trade Association (EFTA). All the Nordic countries are however members of the European Economic Area (EEA).

Geography 

The Nordic countries and self-governing regions in alphabetic order – number of inhabitants (2018), area (km2) and population density (people/km2):

Denmark is by far the most densely populated country, whilst Sweden, Norway and Finland are low populated and similar to each other from this perspective. Iceland has both the lowest population and by far the lowest population density. But large areas in Finland, Norway and Sweden, like most of Iceland, are unpopulated. There are no such areas in Denmark. Denmark has a population density around continental average, higher than for instance France and Poland but lower when compared to the United Kingdom, Italy or Germany. Finland, Norway and Sweden has a population density that is a little lower than the United States, but higher than Canada. In round figures, Iceland's population density resembles Canada's.

Land and water area 

This list includes dependent territories within their sovereign states (including uninhabited territories), but does not include claims on Antarctica. EEZ+TIA is exclusive economic zone (EEZ) plus total internal area (TIA) which includes land and internal waters.

Denmark 

The Kingdom of Denmark includes the home-rule (hjemmestyre) territory of the Faroe Islands and the self-rule (selvstyre) territory of Greenland.

The Nordic countries have a combined area of around 3.5 million square kilometres and their geography is extremely varied. The area is so vast that it covers five time zones. To the east the region borders Russia, and on the west the Canadian coastline can be seen from Greenland on a clear day. Even excluding Greenland and the Norwegian islands of Svalbard and Jan Mayen, the remaining part of the Nordic countries covers around 1.3 million square kilometres. This is about the same area as France, Germany and Italy together. To the south, the countries neighbor the Baltic states, Poland, Germany and the United Kingdom, while to the north there is the Arctic Ocean.

Notable natural features of the Nordic countries include the Norwegian fjords, the Archipelago Sea between Finland and Sweden, the extensive volcanic and geothermal activity of Iceland, and Greenland, which is the largest island in the world. The southernmost point of the Nordic countries is Gedser, on the island of Falster in Denmark. The northernmost point is Kaffeklubben Island in Greenland, which is also the northernmost point of land on Earth. The largest cities and capitals of the Nordic countries are situated on the southern parts of the region, with the exception of Reykjavík, the capital of Iceland. Helsinki, Oslo and Stockholm are all close to the same latitude as the southernmost point of Greenland, Egger Island (Itilleq): about 60°N.

Topography 

All of Denmark and most of Finland lie below 200 m and the topography of both is relatively flat. In Denmark, moraines and tunnel valleys add some relief to the landscape while in Finland the surroundings of lakes Pielinen and Päijänne display some moderate relief. The Finnish area just east of Bothnian Bay stands out as the largest plain in the Nordic countries. The Scandinavian Mountains dominate the landscape of Norway. The southern part of the Scandinavian Mountains is broader than the northern one and contains higher peaks. The southern part contains also a series of plateaux and gently undulating plains. The western parts of the mountains are cut by fjords, producing a dramatic landscape. The landscape of Sweden can be described as a mixture of that of Norway, Finland and Denmark. Except at the High Coast the coastal areas of Sweden form lowlands. Sweden has three highland areas, the South Swedish Highlands, the Scandinavian Mountains and the Norrland terrain which is the eastern continuation of the Scandinavian Mountains. The South Swedish Highland and the Norrland terrain are separated by the Central Swedish lowland. The topography of Iceland stands out among the Nordic countries for being a bowl-formed highland.

Climate 

Despite their northern location, the Nordic countries generally have a mild climate compared with other countries that share globally the same latitudes. The climate in the Nordic countries is mainly influenced by their northern location, but remedied by the vicinity to the ocean and the Gulf Stream which brings warm ocean currents from the tip of Florida. Even far to the north, the winters can be quite mild, though north of the Polar Circle the climate zone is mostly subarctic with harsh winters and short summers. In Greenland and Svalbard the climate is polar. The sea has a heavy influence on the weather in the western coastal zones of Iceland, Norway, Denmark and Sweden. The precipitation is high and snow cover during winters is rare. Summers are generally cool.

The further away that one gets from the Atlantic Ocean and the Gulf Stream the colder it gets during the winters. Finland, most of Sweden and the south-eastern part of Norway are influenced by the vast continent to the east which results in warm and long summers and clear and cold winters, often with snow. For example, Bergen at the west coast of Norway normally has a temperature above zero in February while Helsinki in Finland normally will have a temperature of 7–8 °C below zero during the same month.

Climatic conditions and quality of land have determined how land is used in the Nordic countries. In densely populated mainland Denmark there is hardly any wild nature left. Most of the scarce forests are plantations and nearly 60 per cent of Denmark's total area is cultivated or zoned as gardens or parks. On the other hand, in the other Nordic countries there is much wild nature left. Only between 0 and 9 per cent of the land in the other Nordic countries is cultivated. Around 17 per cent of the land area in Iceland is used for permanent meadows and pastures and both Finland, Norway as well as Sweden have large forest areas.

Politics

Political dimension and divisions 

The Nordic region has a political dimension in the joint official bodies called the Nordic Council and the Nordic Council of Ministers. The Helsinki Treaty, signed on 23 March 1962 entered into force on 1 July 1962 and is the political agreement which sets the framework for Nordic cooperation. 23 March is celebrated as the "Nordic Day" as the treaty is sometimes referred to as the constitution of the Nordic cooperation.

Several aspects of the common market as in the EU have been implemented decades before the EU implemented them. Intra-Nordic trade is not covered by the United Nations Convention on Contracts for the International Sale of Goods (CISG), but by local law. The Nordic countries have cooperated closely in the administrative and consular fields since the Nordic Passport Union was established and the Helsinki Treaty concluded. According to the Helsinki Treaty, public officials in the foreign services of any of the Nordic countries are to assist citizens of another Nordic country if that country is not represented in the territory concerned.

Nordic Council and Nordic Council of Ministers 

Nordic cooperation is based on the Helsinki Treaty. Politically, Nordic countries do not form a separate entity, but they cooperate in the Nordic Council and the Nordic Council of Ministers. The council was established after World War II and its first concrete result was the introduction of a Nordic Passport Union in 1952. This resulted in a common labour market and free movement across borders without passports for the countries' citizens. In 1971, the Nordic Council of Ministers, an intergovernmental forum, was established to complement the council. The Nordic Council and the Council of Ministers have their headquarters in Copenhagen and various installations in each separate country, as well as many offices in neighbouring countries. The headquarters are located at Ved Stranden No. 18, close to Slotsholmen.

The Nordic Council consists of 87 representatives, elected from its members' parliaments and reflecting the relative representation of the political parties in those parliaments. It holds its main session in the autumn, while a so-called "theme session" is arranged in the spring. Each of the national delegations has its own secretariat in the national parliament. The autonomous territoriesGreenland, the Faroe Islands and Ålandalso have Nordic secretariats. The Council does not have any formal power on its own, but each government has to implement any decisions through its country's legislative assembly. With Denmark, Iceland, and Norway being members of NATO and Finland and Sweden being neutral, the Nordic Council has not been involved in any military cooperation. However, the Nordic foreign and security policy cooperation has become closer and over the past few years expanded its scope.

The Nordic Council of Ministers is responsible for inter-governmental cooperation. Prime ministers have ultimate responsibility, but this is usually delegated to the Minister for Nordic Cooperation and the Nordic Committee for Co-operation, which coordinates the day-to-day work. The autonomous territories have the same representation as states.

Nordic model 

The Nordic countries share an economic and social model, which involves the combination of a market economy with a welfare state financed with heavy taxes. The welfare states were largely developed by strong social democrat parties and in Finland with cooperation with the Agrarian League. Although the specifics differ between countries and there are ongoing political arguments, there is a strong consensus about keeping to the general concept.

A central theme in the Nordic model is the "universalist" welfare state aimed specifically at enhancing individual autonomy, promoting social mobility and ensuring the universal provision of basic human rights, as well as for stabilizing the economy. In this model welfare is not just aid to those who are in need of it, but a central part of the life of everybody: education is free, healthcare has zero or nominal fees in most cases, most children go to municipal day care, etc.

The Nordic model is distinguished from other types of welfare states by its emphasis on maximizing labour force participation, promoting gender equality, egalitarian and extensive benefit levels, the large magnitude of income redistribution and liberal use of expansionary fiscal policy. Trade unions are strong.

The model has been successful: the countries are among the wealthiest worldwide and there is little social unrest. In 2015, Save the Children ranked the Nordic countries as number 1–5 of countries where mothers and children fare the best (among 179 countries studied).

Elections 

Nordic parliaments are all based on a one-chamber system. The Norwegian parliament, the Storting, did actually function as two separate chambers until 2009 when dealing with certain issues. The Icelandic Althing, founded in 930 AD, is reputed to be the oldest working parliament in the world. However, it was dissolved for much of the first half of the 19th century. In Denmark, Iceland and Sweden elections are held at least once every four years. Finland, Åland and Norway have fixed four-year election periods. Elections in the Faroe Islands and Greenland follow the Danish system of elections. The Danish Folketing has 179 seats, including two seats each for the Faroe Islands and Greenland. The Finnish Eduskunta has 200 seats, including one seat for Åland. The Icelandic Althing has 63 seats, the Norwegian Storting 169 seats and the Swedish Riksdag 349 seats. The Faroese Løgting has 32 seats, Greenland's Inatsisartut 31 seats and Åland's Lagtinget 30 seats.

Nordic citizens – and in the three member countries of the EU also EU citizens – living in another Nordic country are normally entitled to vote in local government elections after three months of residence, while other foreign citizens have to reside in the Nordic countries for three to four years before they are eligible to vote. In Denmark and the Faroe Islands, the percentage turn-out at elections is close to 90% per cent, but it is only about 67% in Åland and Finland. Men are more often elected to the national assembly compared to women. The biggest bias between the two sexes is seen in the Faroe Islands and Åland, while in Sweden men and women are close to being equally represented in the national assembly.

Nordic Passport Union 

The Nordic Passport Union, created in 1954 and implemented on 1 May 1958, allows citizens of the Nordic countries: Denmark (Faroe Islands included since 1 January 1966, Greenland not included), Sweden, Norway (Svalbard, Bouvet Island and Queen Maud Land not included), Finland and Iceland (since 24 September 1965) to cross approved border districts without carrying and having their passport checked. Other citizens can also travel between the Nordic countries' borders without having their passport checked, but still have to carry some sort of approved travel identification documents. During the 2015 European migrant crisis, temporary border controls were set up between Denmark and Sweden to control the movement of refugees into Sweden.

Since 1996, these countries have been part of the larger EU directive Schengen Agreement area, comprising 30 countries in Europe. Border checkpoints have been removed within the Schengen Area and only a national ID card is required. Within the Nordic area any means of proving one's identity, e.g. a driving licence, is valid for Nordic citizens because of the Nordic Passport Union. When traveling to other countries than the Nordics, public officials in the foreign services of any of the Nordic countries are to assist citizens of another Nordic country if that country is not represented in the territory concerned, according to the Helsinki Treaty.

Since 25 March 2001, the Schengen acquis has fully applied to the five countries of the Nordic Passport Union (except for the Faroe Islands). There are some areas in the Nordic Passport Union that give extra rights for Nordic citizens, not covered by Schengen, such as less paperwork if moving to a different Nordic country and fewer requirements for naturalisation.

European integration and international cooperation 

The political cooperation between the Nordic countries has not led to a common policy or an agreement on the countries' memberships in the EU, Eurozone and NATO. Norway and Iceland are the only Nordic countries not members of the EU – both countries are instead members of EFTA. Finland and Sweden are the only Nordic countries not members of NATO. Denmark alone participates in both organizations. Only Finland is a member of the Eurozone. The Nordics are however all part of the European lex. The tasks and policies of the EU overlap with the Nordic Council significantly, e.g. the Schengen Agreement, Freedom of movement for workers in the European Union and Free Movement Directive partially supersedes the Nordic passport-free zone and the common Nordic labor market. The Schengen Area covers all the Nordic countries, excluding the Faroe Island and Svalbard.

Additionally, certain areas of Nordic countries have special relationships with the EU. For example, Finland's autonomous island province Åland is not a part of the EU VAT zone.

In the EU, the Northern Dimension refers to external and cross-border policies covering the Nordic countries, the Baltic countries and Russia.

There is no explicit provision in the Treaty on European Union or Treaty on the Functioning of the European Union that takes Nordic cooperation into account. However, the Treaties provide that international agreements concluded by the Member States before they become members of the Union remain valid, even if they are contrary to the provisions of Union law. Each Member State must nonetheless take all necessary measures to eliminate any discrepancies as quickly as possible. Nordic cooperation can therefore in practice only be designed to the extent that it complies with Union law. Sweden and Finland issued a joint declaration when they joined the EU: "The Contracting Parties notes that Sweden [...] and Finland, as members of the European Union, intend to continue their Nordic co-operation, both with each other and with other countries and territories, in full compliance with Community law and other provisions of the Maastricht Treaty."

Article 121 of the EEA-agreement states that "the provisions of the Agreement shall not preclude cooperation: (a) within the framework of the Nordic cooperation to the extent that such cooperation does not impair the good functioning of this Agreement".

Current leaders 
All the Nordic countries are long-established parliamentary democracies. Denmark, Norway and Sweden have a political system of constitutional monarchy, in which a nonpolitical monarch acts as head of state and the de facto executive power is exercised by a cabinet led by a prime minister. Margrethe II has reigned in Denmark as Queen Regnant and head of state since 14 January 1972, Carl XVI Gustaf became King of Sweden on 15 September 1973 and King Harald V of Norway has reigned since 17 January 1991.

Finland and Iceland have been parliamentary republics since their independence. Both countries are led by prime ministers, whilst the directly elected president acts mostly as a ceremonial head of state with some legislative power. Finland had a long tradition of having a strong presidential system, since in the beginning of its independence Prince Frederick Charles of Hesse was elected to the throne of Finland and Finland was to become a monarchy. This failed due to World War I and the fall of the German Empire and so it was a compromise that Finland became a republic with a strong head of state. The President's powers were once so broad that it was said Finland was the only real monarchy in northern Europe. However, amendments passed in 1999 reduced his powers somewhat and the President now shares executive authority with the Prime Minister.

Economy 

The Nordic economies are among the countries in the Western world with the best macroeconomic performance in the recent ten years. Denmark, Finland, Norway and Sweden have for example experienced constant and large excess exports in recent years. Iceland is the only country which has balance of payments deficits . At the same time, unemployment is low in most of the Nordic countries compared with the rest of Europe. As a result of the cyclical down-turn, the public balance is now in deficit, except for Norway. Over the past ten years, the Nordic countries had a noticeably larger increase in their gross domestic product (GDP) than the Eurozone. The only exceptions were Denmark and Åland which had a lower growth. Measured by GDP per capita, the Nordic countries have a higher income than the Eurozone countries. Norway's GDP per capita is as high as 80 per cent above the EA17 average and Norway is actually one of the countries with the highest standard of living in the world.

However, after the financial crisis of 2007–2008 and the following recession all the Nordic countries have been affected by the global crisis though to varying degrees. Iceland was most affected and had an economic crisis from 2008 to 2011, but GDP growth was also negative in all the other Nordic countries in 2008 and 2009. From 2009 most of the Nordic countries experienced growth again. The Nordic Council has set an objective for Nordic cooperation to achieve stable and sustainable economic growth, development of the Nordic welfare model, economic integration in the Nordic region and the promotion of joint Nordic interests at international level.

Private consumption has fallen during the crisis, but it gained pace again from 2010 onward. The decline was most profound in Denmark, Finland and Iceland. On the other hand, public consumption has experienced positive growth rates – except for Iceland since 2008 and Denmark since 2010. The general rise is due to the many fiscal initiatives made by the Nordic governments to support economic growth and the financial and business sectors. From 2006 Iceland has experienced a fall in gross capital formation. This is after many years with an Icelandic growth particularly driven by investments, which had more than tripled in the recent ten years. Iceland also holds a leading position compared to the other Nordic countries regarding growth in public consumption in the years from 2000 to 2008.

Recent years’ large balance-of-payments surplus in Denmark, Finland, Norway and Sweden has reduced the countries’ foreign debt. In addition to a balance-of-payments surplus or deficit, the size of a country's foreign debt and foreign assets is affected by the exchange rate and the price of securities. Consequently, Finland's foreign debt increased noticeably when the price of technology shares increased drastically in the late 1990s due to a large proportion of these shares being owned by households, funds and companies abroad. In this way, these foreign owners held a greater claim on Finland. When share prices decreased drastically in 1999–2001 in the dot-com bubble, it also led to a marked decrease in Finland's net foreign debt. Iceland's foreign net debt accounts for close to five times of its GDP. This means that Iceland owes the surrounding world values corresponding to five times the country's total production. Sweden also had foreign debts by the end of 2010, but at a much smaller scale. In 2012, all Nordic countries had a surplus on the total balance of payments. Norway accounts for a substantial foreign exchange surplus, which is due to revenue from exports of oil and gas.

Industries 

Since the late 1990s, the Nordic manufacturing industry has accounted for a slightly declining proportion of the gross domestic product, with Norway being a distinct exception. In Norway, the manufacturing industry's proportion of GDP is still at a high level of around 35 per cent due to the large oil and natural gas sector. In the rest of the Nordic countries, the proportion lies between 15 and 20 per cent. Despite growing production, the manufacturing industry accounts for a decreasing proportion of total employment in the Nordic countries. Among the Nordic countries, Finland is today the number one Nordic industrial country, as the manufacturing industry in Finland accounts for the greatest proportion of the country's jobs, around 16 per cent. By way of comparison, in Denmark, Norway and Iceland it only accounts for less than 13 per cent of total employment.

The service sector has increased drastically in all Nordic countries in the last 15 years and today accounts for about three fourths of all employed persons. Denmark, Norway, Iceland, Sweden and Åland have the largest proportion of employed in the service sector, between 75 and more than 90 per cent of those employed, while the corresponding figure is 72 per cent in Finland and 70 per cent in Iceland. The service sector is a little smaller if its proportion of total gross domestic product is measured compared to the share of employment. In Norway, the service sector accounts for 57 per cent of GDP, in Iceland for 66 per cent, in Finland for 69 per cent, in Sweden for 72 per cent and in Denmark for 78 per cent. The service sector includes retail and wholesale trade, hotels, restaurants, transportation, communication, financial services, real estate sale, renting, business services and other services such as teaching and care of children, sick persons and the elderly – services which are typically rendered by the public sector in the Nordic countries.

Foreign investments 
Iceland and Sweden have the highest rate of foreign direct investment, both with regards to foreign companies investing in Iceland and Sweden and Icelandic and Swedish companies investing abroad. However, in 2011 Denmark superseded Sweden regarding outward investments. Looking at a larger time span of ten years, most of the Nordic countries have experienced growth in both inward and outward investments.

However, Iceland has been in a league of its own in this area. Foreign investment from Iceland increased significantly and sharply especially from 2003 to 2007 from 16 to 123 per cent of GDP. The expansion of Icelandic companies into foreign markets was a rapid process. Strong pension funds provided capital for investments, and the privatization of the banking system made new sources of financing available for companies wishing to expand their operations. Also inward investment to Iceland increased sharply from 2003, but at a more moderate level compared with other Nordic countries. This pattern changed in 2007 with dramatic decreases in both outward and inward foreign direct investment.

Foreign and intra-Nordic trade 

Nordic cooperation is characterized largely by the international community and the global challenges and opportunities. The Nordic countries, which are relatively small, have historically and still are benefiting greatly by obtaining common use in cooperation with other countries and institutions. The Nordic economies are small and open and thus the countries are export-depending. Foreign trade constitutes an important part of the economic activity. Nordic foreign trade in goods, measured as the average of imports and exports, amounts to more than one fourth of GDP in the Nordic countries. All the Nordic countries except Finland had a surplus in their balance of trade in 2012 and every year since 1995 Denmark, Norway and Sweden have all had greater exports than imports.

The trade between the Nordic countries is especially considerable as about one fifth of the countries’ foreign trade is trade with other Nordic countries. The total population of the Nordic countries of around 26 million people makes them to a far greater extent dependent on each other with respect to exports and imports, compared to for example Germany with a population of 82 million people. Swedish exports to the other Nordic countries account for a considerably higher share than combined Swedish exports to Germany and France – despite the fact that the total population of Germany and France is 147 million people, while Denmark, Finland, Iceland and Norway only have a total population of 16 million. In 2012, around 23 per cent of the total exports from both Denmark and Sweden went to other Nordic countries. Other Nordic countries account for 16 per cent of Finnish exports, 13 per cent of Norwegian exports and 10 per cent of the total exports in Iceland.

In addition to the other Nordic countries, The EU is the largest trading partner for the Nordic countries. Especially important is trade with Germany, Belgium and the Netherlands. Outside of Europe, the United States is also a major trading partner. A common characteristic in the exports of the Nordic countries is a concentration on a few products. The exports of Greenland and the Faroe Islands are entirely dominated by fish and fish products, to a lesser extent in Iceland where aluminium exports also contribute significantly. Oil and gas are the predominant products exported by Norway and Finnish exports are dominated by wood, paper and paper products and telecommunication equipment. Danish and Swedish exports are more equally distributed on different products, with processed food, pharmaceuticals and chemical products as the major Danish export products and cars, wood, paper products and telecommunication equipment as predominant in Swedish exports. Germany is completely dominant when it comes to Nordic imports. However, the Nordic countries also have considerable imports from the Netherlands, China and Russia.

Energy 

The Nordic region is one of the richest sources of energy in the world. Apart from the natural occurrence of fossil fuels such as oil and gas, the Nordic countries also have good infrastructure and technology to exploit renewable energy sources such as water, wind, bio-energy and geothermal heat. Especially Iceland and Norway, but also Finland and Sweden, have a significant production of electricity based on hydro power. Geothermal energy production is the most important
source of energy in Iceland, whilst nuclear power is produced in both Finland and in Sweden. The indigenous production of energy in the Nordic countries has risen considerably over the last couple of decades – especially in Denmark and Norway due to oil deposits in the North Sea.

The most important energy sources in the Nordic countries measured in terms of energy supply in million toe (tonnes oil equivalent) are in order of importance: oil, solid fuels (e.g. coal and wood), nuclear power, hydro and geothermal power and solar energy and gas. In the EU, the most important source of energy is also oil, but gas comes in second. Hydro and geothermal power and other renewable sources of energy are major sources in the Nordic countries as compared to the EU countries. Particularly in Iceland and Norway, hydro and geothermal power constitute a major share of the overall energy supply. Denmark depends almost entirely on thermal power generated from coal, oil and gas. Iceland obtains a substantial part of its energy for heating from geothermal energy and depends almost entirely upon hydro-power resources for its production of electricity.

Tourism 

The Nordic countries in order of popularity with tourists are Sweden, Norway, Denmark, Finland then Iceland.

Demographics 

At the beginning of the 20th century, almost 12 million people lived in the Nordic countries. Today, the population has increased to 27 million people. The Nordic countries have one of the lowest population densities in the world. The low density is partly due to the fact that many parts of the Nordic countries are marginal areas, where nature puts limitations on settlement. In four out of five Nordic countries, around 20 per cent of the population is to be found in the vicinity of the respective capitals. In Iceland, this percentage is even higher, with more than 60 per cent of Icelanders residing at or nearby the capital city of Reykjavík.

During the past 100 years, the population growth has been strongest in Greenland, where the population has multiplied by almost five, from 12,000 to 56,000 people. In Iceland, the increase has gone from 78,000 to 322,000 people. The population on the Faroe Islands has more than tripled, from 15,000 to 48,000 people. The Swedish and Ålandic populations are the only ones that have not at least doubled. Since 1990, the total population in the Nordic countries has increased by more than 2.8 million people (12 per cent) – the most in Iceland (27 per cent) and in Norway and Åland by 19 and close to 18 per cent. Certain regions in Finland, Norway and Sweden have experienced a decline in the population due to urbanization, but at the national level all the Nordic countries have experienced growth. Compared to 2005, both the Faroe Islands and Greenland have experienced a minor decline in the population. Iceland has also experienced shorter periods with a declining population. The Danish population is expected to increase by 8 per cent until 2035, while Finland and Sweden expect an increase in the population of about 10 and almost 16 per cent respectively.

Life expectancy is rising in all the Nordic countries, though the levels vary greatly. Life expectancy for men in Greenland is 68.3 years (2011), compared to 80.8 years for men in Iceland. Women in the Faroe Islands and in Åland are expected to live the longest – more than 84 years. The population in the Nordic countries is getting older and according to the population projection for the Nordic countries as a whole, the share of the population above the age of 80 will reach 8.4 per cent in 2040, as compared to the 2013 level of 4.7 per cent. The share of population 80 years or older has increased from 1990 to 2013. The increase in the share of people above the age of 80 over the last 10 years is partly due to the fact that the death rate has fallen for almost all age groups and partly that the number of births has been low during the same period. In the next 25 years, the demographic dependency ratio is expected to have the strongest growth in Finland and Åland. According to the most recent population forecasts in Finland and Åland, in 2030 it is expected that people over 65 will make up 50 per cent of the adult population. Sweden and Denmark can look forward to a relatively modest increase in the next decades. Iceland and Norway seem to maintain their positions with the lowest proportions of elderly people in the Nordic countries.

Languages 

Most of the Nordic languages belong to one of three linguistic families: North Germanic languages, Finno-Ugric languages and Eskimo–Aleut languages. Although the area is linguistically heterogeneous, with three unrelated language groups, the common linguistic heritage is one of the factors making up the Nordic identity.

Danish, Faroese, Icelandic, Norwegian and Swedish belong to the North Germanic branch of the Indo-European languages. The languages have developed from a common Nordic language, but have moved away from each other during the past 1000 years. However, it is still possible for Danish, Norwegian and Swedish speakers to understand each other. These languages are taught in school throughout the Nordic countries: for example, Swedish is a mandatory subject in Finnish schools, whereas Danish is mandatory in Icelandic and Faroese schools. Approximately 5,3 per cent of population of Finland speak Swedish as their mother tongue.

In the Finnish-Sami group of the Finno-Ugric languages, Finnish is the most widely spoken language in the Nordic countries. However, other languages in this family are also spoken in the region. Various Sami languages are spoken in northern Finland, Norway and Sweden. Karelian is spoken a little in Finland, the Kven language in Norway and Meänkieli or "Torne Valley Finnish" in Sweden. Finns are also the largest immigrant group in Sweden, around 4.46 per cent of the total population; and Finnish is an official minority language of Sweden.

Greenlandic or Kalaallisut belongs to the Inuit branch of the Eskimo-Aleut languages and is spoken in Greenland. The language is related to a number of languages spoken in northern Canada and Alaska. , the Greenland Home rule does not require Danish to be taught or the use of Danish for official purposes.

A number of other minority languages also exist in the region. German is spoken by a minority in Southern Jutland and their cultural and language rights are protected by the government. Finnish Kale, Norwegian and Swedish Travellers and other Romani peoples of the Nordic countries have the right to maintain and develop their language and culture. Yiddish is also an official minority language in Sweden. Besides the so-called "natural" languages national variants of sign languages are used. The Icelandic Sign Language is derived from the Danish, while the Finnish Sign Language is developed on the basis of the Swedish variant. The right to use sign language is set in the Finnish Language Act and in Sweden the Swedish Sign Language is an official minority language.

Migration 
In 2012, net migration had the greatest impact on the population increase in Sweden. That was also the case with Denmark, Finland, Åland and Norway. In the Faroe Islands, Greenland and Iceland, natural population increase had the greatest impact on the population change, but both Greenland and the Faroe Islands still had a slight decrease in the population due to a negative net migration in 2012.

A large proportion of the migration in the Nordic countries occurs between and among the countries themselves, largely as the result of the free labour market and liberal rules for the exchange of students in the Nordic countries. The trend has led to an increasing number of foreign citizens in the Nordic countries during the past few decades. In all the countries, the major part of the foreign citizens is non-Nordic. That is not the case for Greenland and the Faroe Islands, which have a high proportion of other Nordic citizens. Non-nationals range from 47 per cent of the total immigration in Iceland, to 89 per cent in Norway. In 2013 the largest proportions of non-nationals were in Norway and Denmark, where they account for 8.9 and 8.8 per cent of the population. The proportion
of non-nationals in the Finnish population is small compared to the other Nordic countries – 3.6 per cent in 2013 – but the proportion has risen significantly during and after the 1990s.

Sami people 

The Sami people, also spelled Sámi or Saami, are a Finno-Ugric people who have their traditional settlement areas in northern Finland, Norway and Sweden and Western Russia. Most Sami live in Norway, followed by Sweden and Finland, while the fewest Sami live in Russia. Because the countries do not make an official record of who has the Sami identity or background, no one knows the exact number of the Sami people. The Sami are the only indigenous people of the Nordic countries excluding Greenland that are recognized and protected under the international conventions of indigenous peoples. They are hence the northernmost indigenous people of Europe. There are several Sami languages.

Traditionally, the Sami have plied a variety of livelihoods, including coastal fishing, fur trapping and sheep herding. However, the best known Sami livelihood is semi-nomadic reindeer herding. For traditional, environmental, cultural and political reasons, reindeer herding is legally reserved only for Sami people in certain regions of the Nordic countries. Nowadays, the Sami work in all sectors, in line with the non-Sami population, though the primary industries are still important culture bearers for the Sami people.

Culture 

Nordic countries have historically been one of the most socially progressive cultures in the world and culture is one of the main components of cooperation between the Nordic countries. The policies of the Nordic countries with respect to cultural life, mass media and religion have many shared values and features in common. However, some differences may be pointed out and for instance cultural institutions arising from historical circumstances. In both Denmark and Sweden, there are cultural institutions with roots in the traditions of the royal courts. In these countries, national institutions formed the foundation of cultural life at an early stage while in Norway cultural institutions began to form later.

Iceland has the highest government expenditure on culture, a total of 3.3 per cent of its GDP in 2011. Denmark comes second with a total of 1.6 per cent of GDP in 2011. Sweden spend the least in 2011 with 1.1 per cent. Looking at per capita expenditure, Iceland again has the highest expenditure with Norway coming second. Greenland spends the third highest amount on culture and leisure per capita. In Iceland and Norway, expenditures have more than doubled since 2000. In the other Nordic countries, expenditures have gone up between 40 and 50 per cent in the same period.

Denmark has the most museums, a total of 274, but museums in Åland and Iceland have the most visitors, an average of 4 and 5 visits per inhabitant. Many theatres in the Nordic countries receive public funding. Theatre funding constitutes a major share of allocations within the cultural area in all the countries. All countries have national theatres, where plays, ballets and operas are performed. In addition to the national theatres, there are professional regional theatres, which are also supported by the state, counties or municipalities. Most countries also have a few private theatres and many amateur ensembles, which may be supported at least partially by municipalities, primarily.

Nordic Culture Fund, established in 1966, aims to support a broad spectrum of cultural cooperations between the Nordic countries. The Fund's ambition is to enable talented artists, both professionals and amateurs, to enrich each other via the cultural diversity that exists among the 26 million or more people of the Region. Its activities are based on an agreement between the Nordic countries, which came into force in 1967. The Fund receives its money in the form of an annual grant from the Nordic Council of Ministers.

Music 

Nordic countries share certain traditions in music, many of which have diverged significantly. In folk music, Denmark, Iceland, Norway, Sweden and the Faroe Islands share many common aspects. Greenland's Inuit culture has its own musical traditions, influenced by Scandinavian culture. Finland shares many cultural similarities with both the other Nordic countries as well as Estonia. The Sami have their own unique culture, with ties to the neighboring cultures.

Art music has a strong position in Nordic countries. Apart from state-owned opera houses, there are symphony orchestras in most major cities. The most prominent historical composers from Nordic countries are the Finn Jean Sibelius, the Dane Carl Nielsen and the Norwegian Edvard Grieg. Of contemporary composers, the Finns Magnus Lindberg, Kaija Saariaho and Esa-Pekka Salonen are among the most often performed in the world.

Rock and roll influences that came from the United States and United Kingdom were the start of the Nordic pop scene, but influences from the Nordic folk music can still be found today in popular music. Common characteristic in Nordic pop music is that it can often be either very lighthearted pop music or very dark metal. Some of the most well-known Nordic music groups include ABBA, Ace of Base, a-ha, Aqua, Björk, The Cardigans, Europe, Hanoi Rocks, Roxette, The Rasmus, Kaizers Orchestra and The Spotnicks. Sweden and Finland have possibly the largest music industries in the area, especially Sweden which is the largest exporter of pop music per capita and the third largest overall after the United States and the United Kingdom. Norway, Iceland and Denmark have all had successful domestic record industries for many years.

The Nordic metal scene is highly visible compared to other genres from the region. Many big names such as Amon Amarth, Children of Bodom, In Flames, Meshuggah and Opeth originate from the Nordic countries. Nordic metal bands have had a long and lasting influence on the metal subculture alongside their counterparts in the United Kingdom and the United States. The black metal genre was developed in Norway by bands such as Mayhem, Darkthrone, Burzum, Immortal and Emperor and the related genre of Viking metal was developed throughout the Nordic region by bands such as Bathory, Enslaved, Burzum, Emperor, Einherjer, Moonsorrow and Amon Amarth.

Since 2000, the total sale of music has declined by almost 50 per cent in all the Nordic countries and at the same time the digital sale has increased (digital sales cover both downloads and streaming of music). In Denmark, Norway and Finland, the sale of digital music has increased by 400 per cent since 2006 and now amounts to 39, 27 and 25 per cent of the total sale in 2010/2011. In Denmark and Sweden, sales of digital music rose almost eight-fold in the same period and now represent 51 per cent of the total sale. In Iceland, digital sales still only represent three per cent of the total sale.

Literature 

The earliest written records from Scandinavia are runic inscriptions on memorial stones and other objects. Some of those contain allusions to Norse mythology and even short poems in alliterative verse. The best known example is the elaborate Rök runestone (c. 800) which alludes to legends from the migration age. The oldest of the Eddic poems are believed to have been composed in the 9th century, though they are only preserved in 13th-century manuscripts. They tell of the myths and heroic legends of Scandinavia. Skaldic poetry is mostly preserved in late manuscripts but was preserved orally from the 9th century onwards and also appears on runestones, such as the Karlevi Runestone. In Iceland the sagas of Icelanders are the best-known specimens of Icelandic literature. In Finland the most famous collection of folk poetry is by far the Kalevala, which is the national epic of the country.

Nordic countries have produced important and influential literature. Henrik Ibsen, a Norwegian playwright, was largely responsible for the popularity of modern realistic drama in Europe, with plays like The Wild Duck and A Doll's House. His contemporary, Swedish novelist and playwright August Strindberg, was a forerunner of experimental forms such as expressionism, symbolism and surrealism. Nobel prizes for literature have been awarded to Selma Lagerlöf, Verner von Heidenstam, Karl Adolph Gjellerup, Henrik Pontoppidan, Knut Hamsun, Sigrid Undset, Erik Axel Karlfeldt, Frans Eemil Sillanpää, Johannes Vilhelm Jensen, Pär Lagerkvist, Halldór Laxness, Nelly Sachs, Eyvind Johnson, Harry Martinson and Tomas Tranströmer. World-famous Nordic children's book writers include Hans Christian Andersen, Tove Jansson and Astrid Lindgren.

Since 1962, the Nordic Council has awarded a literature prize once a year for a work of fiction written in one of the Nordic languages. Since its establishment, the prize has been won by 15 Swedish, 10 Danish, 10 Norwegian, 8 Finnish, 7 Icelandic, 2 Faroe and 1 Sami writers.

Nordic libraries function as information centres with a wide variety of services and access to all kinds of printed and electronic media. In the last twenty years, there has been an overall decline in stock and lending of books in public libraries. Despite the general decline in stock and loans, most of the Nordic countries have had an increase in the lending of other media than books. Since 2000, the stock of other media has increased between 30 and 85 per cent in the Nordic countries. The lending of books has at the same time decreased in all Nordic countries, a decline between 10 and 20 per cent.

Art

National symbols 

The Nordic countries, including the autonomous territories of the Faroe Islands and Åland, have a similar flag design, all based on the Dannebrog, the Danish flag. They display an off-centre cross with the intersection closer to the hoist – the "Nordic cross" or "Scandinavian cross"– however each has a different aspect ratio. Greenland and Sápmi have adopted flags without the Nordic cross, but they both feature a circle which is placed off-centre, similar to the cross.

See also

Associated 
 Climate of the Nordic countries
 Comparison of the Nordic countries
 Subdivisions of the Nordic countries
 Universal basic income in the Nordic countries

Others 
 Baltic region
 Baltoscandia
 British Isles
 Nordic-Baltic Eight
 Nordic identity in Estonia

Notes

References

Further reading 
 Clerc, Louis; Glover, Nikolas; Jordan, Paul, eds. Histories of Public Diplomacy and Nation Branding in the Nordic and Baltic Countries: Representing the Periphery (Leiden: Brill Nijhoff, 2015). 348 pp. . online review
 Elmgren, Ainur and Norbert Götz (eds.). Theme issue "Power Investigation: The Political Culture of Nordic Self-Understanding". Journal of Contemporary European Studies 21 (2013) 3: 338–412.
 Götz, Norbert and Heidi Haggrén (eds.). Regional Cooperation and International Organizations: The Nordic Model in Transnational Alignment. London: Routledge, 2009.
 Götz, Norbert and Carl Marklund (eds.). The Paradox of Openness: Transparency and Participation in Nordic Cultures of Consensus. Leiden: Brill, 2015.
 Kjellberg, Anders (2022) The Nordic Model of Industrial Relations. Lund: Department of Sociology.
 Strang, Johan (ed.). Nordic Cooperation: A European Region in Transition. London: Routledge, 2016.

External links 

 Norden, website of the Nordic Council and Nordic Council of Ministers
 Nordic Countries, railway map of the Nordic countries
 Nordregio, European centre for research, education and documentation on spatial development, established by the Nordic Council of Ministers. Includes maps and graphs
 Go Scandinavia, official website of the Scandinavian Tourist Boards in North America
 Scandinavia House, the Nordic Center in New York, run by the American-Scandinavian Foundation
 vifanord, a digital library that provides scientific information on the Nordic and Baltic countries as well as the Baltic region as a whole
 Mid Nordic Committee, Nordic organization to promote sustainable development and growth in the region (archived 17 December 2009)
 The Helsinki Treaty of 1962, nicknamed the constitution of the Nordic countries

 
Nordic Council
Regions of Europe
Regions of North America
Geography of Northern Europe
Geography of North America
Cultural regions